Circle with Towers is a concrete block 2005/2012 sculpture by American artist Sol LeWitt, installed outside the Bill and Melinda Gates Computer Science Complex on the University of Texas at Austin campus in Austin, Texas, United States. Previously, the artwork was installed in Madison Square Park; the university's public art program, Landmarks, purchased the sculpture from the Madison Square Park Conservancy.

References

External links

 

Concrete sculptures in the United States
Outdoor sculptures in Austin, Texas
University of Texas at Austin campus